Garaeus is a genus of moths in the family Geometridae described by Frederic Moore in 1868.

Selected species
 Garaeus absona C. Swinhoe, 1889
 Garaeus acuminaria Leech, 1897
 Garaeus albipunctatus Hampson, 1895
 Garaeus altapicata Holloway, 1976
 Garaeus apicata Moore, 1868
 Garaeus argillacea Butler, 1889
 Garaeus chamaeleon Wehrli, 1936
 Garaeus colorata Warren, 1893
 Garaeus conspicienda Holloway, 1993
 Garaeus cruentatus Butler, 1886
 Garaeus fenestratus Butler, 1887
 Garaeus ferrugata Warren, 1896
 Garaeus flavipicta Hampson, 1912
 Garaeus formosanus Bastelberger, 1911
 Garaeus fulvata Walker, 1861
 Garaeus karykina Wehrli, 1924
 Garaeus kiushiuana (Hori, 1926)
 Garaeus lateritiaria (Poujade, 1895)
 Garaeus luteus (Wileman, 1910)
 Garaeus mirandus (Butler, 1881)
 Garaeus muscorarius Hampson, 1897
 Garaeus nankingensis Wehrli, 1937
 Garaeus nigra Inoue, 1954
 Garaeus niveivertex Wehrli, 1936
 Garaeus olivescens Moore, 1888
 Garaeus opicarius Joannis, 1929
 Garaeus papuensis Warren, 1906
 Garaeus parva Hedemann, 1881
 Garaeus phthinophylla Prout, 1928
 Garaeus punctigerus Wehrli, 1926
 Garaeus purpurascens Joicey and Talbot, 1917
 Garaeus pyrsa Prout, 1925
 Garaeus signata Butler, 1886
 Garaeus specularis Moore, 1868
 Garaeus subsparsus Wehrli, 1937
 Garaeus ulucens Holloway, 1976
 Garaeus ustapex Wehrli, 1936
 Garaeus violacearia Leech, 1897
 Garaeus violaria Prout, 1922
 Garaeus virilis Prout, 1915

References

Kandasamy, Gunathilagaraj (2016). "Checklist of Indian Geometridae". Tamil Nadu Agricultural University.

Ourapterygini